The Lake Champlain Maritime Museum (LCMM) is a non-profit museum located in Vergennes, Vermont, USA. It preserves and shares the history and archaeology of Lake Champlain. As a maritime museum specializing in archaeology, LCMM studies the hundreds of shipwrecks discovered in Lake Champlain and plays a major role in the management of those cultural resources. Through the preservation and interpretation of those and other artifacts, the museum tells the story of the people and culture of the Lake Champlain region. It opens to the public from May through mid-October.

History 
Founded in 1985, the museum took up residence in an old stone schoolhouse on the grounds of the Basin Harbor Club, a private resort situated on the lake's shoreline, and opened to the public in 1986. Since then, LCMM has grown to include 18 buildings at two sites housing collections and exhibits, a boat shop and small shipyard, blacksmith facilities, an archaeological conservation laboratory, a museum store, offices, and lecture space.

A major physical expansion occurred in 2001 when the Burlington Shipyard was opened in the city of Burlington, Vermont, some 20 miles north of LCMM's main campus. The following year the museum acquired the Capt. White Place, a c.1815 ship captain's home in Burlington, and in 2004 moved its Burlington offices and exhibits from the shipyard into the Lyman Building, a city-owned facility on the Burlington waterfront.

In June 2017, the museum announced a five phase $44 million plan to raise and preserve the Spitfire, a gunboat that was sunk in the Battle of Valcour Island.

Replica fleet 

A significant part of the museum's effort to understand the region's maritime past is its fleet of replica vessels. Historians and archaeologists at the museum believe that the recreation of historic vessel types offers a unique understanding of the vessels, their crews, and the society of a given era while allowing the public to experience history in a very tangible way.

The smallest of these, and the first replica built at the museum, is the Perseverance, a boat of a type used during the French & Indian War, known as a Bateau. The successful completion of that project in 1986 encouraged the museum and its supporters to build a replica of a revolutionary war gunboat, the Philadelphia II. 

Launched in 1991, that vessel serves today as a focal point for interpreting the British and American campaigns on the Lake in 1776 and is an accurate reproduction of the original vessel which was sunk in combat at the Battle of Valcour Island. It was raised from the lake's bottom in 1935 and is currently preserved at the Smithsonian Institution.

The flagship of the LCMM fleet is the canal schooner Lois McClure. The product of a partnership between the museum and the Lake Champlain Transportation Company, this 88-foot replica was launched in July 2004 after three years of construction in Burlington. Its design is based on the General Butler, a schooner wrecked in Burlington Harbor on December 9, 1876, and the O.J. Walker, another sailing canal boat which sank in 1895.

Programming 
In addition to underwater archaeological research and traditional gallery-style exhibits, LCMM conducts educational, boatbuilding, and boating programs, and hosts lectures, annual juried photography shows, and historical re-enactment events. An active education department offers classes ranging from on-water exploration to traditional crafts, and staff educators conduct wintertime outreach to area schools, visiting students in their classrooms and helping them learn about the American Revolutionary War, 19th-century maritime commerce, and Lake Champlain's archaeological resources.

Each winter, area youth organizations partner with the museum to build either a Cornish pilot gig or a Whitehall pulling boat. This program is intended to help teenage students learn important life skills and develop an improved self-image through the collaborative building process. Those boats are then used in classes and community rowing programs during the boating season.

Events 
In 2005, the Lois McClure toured the lake and the Hudson River, bringing the story of sailing canal boats and the so-called Northern Waterway to residents of the Hudson Valley and New York City. A similar tour was carried out in 2007 on the New York State Barge Canal, the present-day incarnation of the Erie Canal. Visitors were free to board and explore the vessel for no charge and talk to crew members about the boat and the history of the waterway.

Some of the museum's regular annual special events are rowing competitions that are held in the spring and fall, and the Rabble In Arms living history weekend. On that weekend, historical re-enactors gather on the museum grounds to bring to life a significant event from the lake's past, and each year a different event is chosen. There is also an annual small boat show, and exhibits of photos taken by both amateur and professional photographers from around the region.

See also
  List of maritime museums in the United States
  List of museum ships

References

External links
Lake Champlain Maritime Museum

Maritime museums in Vermont
Buildings and structures in Vergennes, Vermont
Museums in Addison County, Vermont
Archaeological museums in Vermont
Champlain Valley National Heritage Area